Catriona Bisset (born 1 March 1994) is an Australian middle-distance athlete and national record holder in the 800 metres.

Career

Early years
Born in Newcastle and raised in Canberra, Bisset participated in Little Athletics from age 6. She displayed potential as a youth, but withdrew from competition for several years as she improved her mental health. During her undergraduate studies at the University of New South Wales, she began training with University of Sydney head coach Dean Gleeson. She resumed racing in 2016. The following year, Bisset moved from Sydney to Melbourne, and Gleeson introduced her to Peter Fortune, best known as the coach of 400m athlete Cathy Freeman.

Breakthrough season
Bisset rose to national prominence in 2019. After improving her personal best throughout the domestic season, she won the 800m at the Australian Track & Field Championships in 2:00.48. One week later, she ran 1:59.78 at the UniSport National Championships to become the first Australian woman in a decade to break the two-minute barrier.

In May, Bisset was selected for her first national team, representing Australia at the 2019 World Relays. She and Josh Ralph placed second in the first-ever mixed 2 × 2 × 400m. Bisset went on to win the 800m at both the 2019 Oceania Championships and 2019 Summer Universiade.

Bisset made her Diamond League debut at the London Grand Prix in July, where she placed second behind Lynsey Sharp. Her time of 1:58.78 set a new Australian record, surpassing the 43-year-old record set by Charlene Rendina, and qualifying Bisset for the Tokyo Olympics. Two months later, she competed at the 2019 World Championships, but was hampered by injury and did not progress beyond the heats.

2020–21
Bisset did not race internationally in 2020 due to COVID-19. However, this allowed her to continue aerobic training and fully recover from injury.

In the 2021 domestic season, she performed at a high level, including a second Olympic qualifier of 1:59.12 to win at the Queensland Track Classic in March. She also successfully defended her 800m national title, officially securing her place on the Australian Olympic team.

On her return to the European circuit in June, Bisset improved her national record at the Janusz Kusociński Memorial, with a time of 1:58.09 (which broke the Oceanian record set by Toni Hodgkinson in 1996). At the Tokyo Olympics, Bisset ran 2:01.65 in the women's 800m heats, narrowly missing her chance to advance. She ended her season in September by competing in her first Diamond League final, running 1:59.66 for 7th at Weltklasse Zürich.

After the racing season, she began training with Linden Hall under the guidance of coach Ned Brophy-Williams.

2022
Bisset made her indoor debut at the Müller Indoor Grand Prix Birmingham in February. She ran 1:59.46 for second behind Keely Hodgkinson, setting another national and Oceanian record in the process. Bisset continued her good form by securing victories in the following two top-level World Indoor Tour meets, including the Copernicus Cup in Toruń, where she defeated Halimah Nakaayi.

Later in March, she placed fifth at the World Indoor Championships in Belgrade with a time of 2:01.24. Two weeks later, back outdoors in Australia, Bisset ran 1:59.83 to win her third consecutive national title.

On the Diamond League circuit, Bisset ran sub-two minutes in Rome, Oslo and Stockholm, including a season's best time of 1:58.54 to finish third in Stockholm behind Mary Moraa and Hodgkinson.

In the first round of the World Championships in July, Bisset was knocked to the track and spiked by a competitor. Nonetheless, she completed the race and was added to the semi-final field by the race jury. The following day, she ran with 11 stitches in her thigh and a swollen knee, but did not advance to the final. Despite her injuries, she competed in the Commonwealth Games in August, placing fifth in a time of 1:59.41.

Competition record

International competitions

Oceanian, and National championships
 Oceania Area Championships in Athletics
 800 metres: 2019
 Australian Athletics Championships
 800 metres: 2019, 2021, 2022
 4 × 400 metres relay: 2019, 2021

Personal life
Bisset is studying a postgraduate degree in architecture and diploma in Chinese language at the University of Melbourne. Her mother was born in Nanjing, China. Part of her schooling was at Melrose High School in the Woden Valley area of Canberra.

References

External links
 
 Catriona Bisset at World Athletics
 Catriona Bisset at Australian Olympic Committee

1994 births
Living people
Australian female middle-distance runners
Universiade gold medalists for Australia
Universiade medalists in athletics (track and field)
Australian Athletics Championships winners
Universiade gold medalists in athletics (track and field)
Medalists at the 2019 Summer Universiade
Athletes (track and field) at the 2020 Summer Olympics
Olympic athletes of Australia
Sportspeople from Newcastle, New South Wales
20th-century Australian women
21st-century Australian women